This is a list of Danish television related events from 2009.

Events
31 January - Niels Brinck is selected to represent Denmark at the 2009 Eurovision Song Contest with his song "Believe Again". He is selected to be the thirty-seventh Danish Eurovision entry during Dansk Melodi Grand Prix held at the Messecenter in Herning.
27 March - Linda Andrews wins the second season of X Factor.
23 October - 23-year-old rapper Kalle Pimp wins the second season of Talent.
20 November - Racing driver Casper Elgaard and his partner Vickie Jo Ringgaard win the sixth season of Vild med dans.

Debuts

Television shows

1990s
Hvem vil være millionær? (1999–present)

2000s
Vild med dans (2005–present)
Talent (2008-2011)
X Factor (2008–present)

Ending this year
Klovn (2005-2009)

Births

Deaths

See also
 2009 in Denmark